Damir Bektić (born 30 January 1997) is a German professional footballer who plays as a midfielder for SV Tasmania Berlin.

Career
In May 2018, following Werder Bremen II's relegation from the 3. Liga, it was announced Bektić would be one of ten players to leave the club.

On 30 October 2019, Bektić joined FC Energie Cottbus on a deal for the rest of the season. He had been training with the team for three months after an injury break in the summer.

International career
Born in Germany, Bektić is of Bosnian descent. He is a former youth international for Germany, having played for the Germany U17s.

Honours
Individual
 Fritz Walter Medal U17 Silver: 2014

References

External links
 

1997 births
Living people
Footballers from Berlin
German footballers
Germany youth international footballers
German people of Bosnia and Herzegovina descent
Association football midfielders
Hertha BSC II players
SV Werder Bremen II players
FC St. Pauli II players
FC Energie Cottbus players
3. Liga players
Regionalliga players